Eduardo Cesar Dos Santos (born October 14, 1983 in Quilmes, Buenos Aires, Argentina) is an Argentine footballer who plays for Sacachispas.

External links
 
 

1983 births
Living people
Argentine footballers
Argentine expatriate footballers
Estudiantes de Buenos Aires footballers
Defensores de Belgrano footballers
Club Atlético Douglas Haig players
Club Almagro players
Talleres de Remedios de Escalada footballers
Rangers de Talca footballers
Irapuato F.C. footballers
Albinegros de Orizaba footballers
La Piedad footballers
Correcaminos UAT footballers
Deportivo Laferrere footballers
Sacachispas Fútbol Club players
Expatriate footballers in Chile
Expatriate footballers in Mexico
Association football forwards
People from Quilmes
Sportspeople from Buenos Aires Province